Allensworth may refer to:

 Lt. Colonel Allen Allensworth (1842 – 1914), United States Army officer
 Jermaine Allensworth, American basketball player
 Allensworth, California, town founded by Col. Allensworth
 Colonel Allensworth State Historic Park, California State Historic Park